Bijou Thaangjam (born Thangjam Biju Singh) is an Indian actor, lyricist, art director, chef and entrepreneur. He is of Meitei descent originally from Imphal, Manipur. He was one of the contestants on the reality cooking competition MasterChef India 2. He is known for his role in the film Mary Kom and Shivaay.

Masterchef India 
Bijou Thaangjam competed on the Star Plus reality cooking competition, Masterchef India. He was one of the Top 50 contestants of Masterchef India 2011.

Career 
Bijou Thaangjam first appeared as a contestant on the reality cooking competition MasterChef India 2. He later debuted as an actor and a lyricist in Omung Kumar's Mary Kom (film) (2014) starring Priyanka Chopra as Mary Kom.

He played the role 'Kancha' in Shivaay (2016) which is a Hindi film directed and produced by Ajay Devgan.

He was also seen in successful films like Jagga Jasoos, Paltan, Happy Phirr Bhag Jayegi, Vodka Diaries, III Smoking Barrels and Penalty.

He also debuted as an Art Director in III Smoking Barrels which earned him a nomination for Best Art Director in Prag Cine Awards 2018.

He has also worked in films like Om The Battle Within and Rocketry: The Nambi Effect which is set for commercial release later in 2022.

Beside films, he acted in web series for various companies like ALT Balaji where he worked in a series The Test Case (web series). Apart from that, he was seen in Netflix show Typewriter directed by Sujoy Ghosh and Bi-Lingual Webseries Kark Rogue for Zee5 and Flesh (web series) for Eros Now.

In 2021 he was seen in a Sony Liv web series Love J Action, Disney+ Hotstar's 1962: The War In The Hills and TVF Original TVF Aspirants.

Filmography

Television

Web series

Producer filmography

Awards and Nominations

References

External links 
 

Male actors from Manipur
Indian chefs
Meitei people
Living people
1986 births
People from Imphal